The 2016 Canadian Championship (officially the Amway Canadian Championship for sponsorship reasons) was a soccer tournament hosted and organized by the Canadian Soccer Association. It was the ninth edition of the annual Canadian Championship, and took place in the cities of Edmonton, Montreal, Ottawa, Toronto and Vancouver in 2016. The participating teams were Ottawa Fury FC and FC Edmonton of the second-division North American Soccer League, and the Montreal Impact, Toronto FC and Vancouver Whitecaps FC of Major League Soccer, the first-level of Canadian club soccer. The Vancouver Whitecaps were the reigning champions; having won their first title in the 2015 competition.

The winner, Toronto FC, was awarded the Voyageurs Cup and was supposed to become Canada's sole entry into the Group Stage of the 2017–18 CONCACAF Champions League. However, due to that tournament's restructuring, it was later announced that the Canadian representative at the 2018 CONCACAF Champions League would be determined by a playoff match between Toronto FC and the 2017 Canadian Championship winner. Toronto FC went on to win the 2017 edition, however, and qualified without the need for a playoff.

Tournament bracket 

The three Major League Soccer and two NASL Canadian clubs are seeded according to their final position in 2015 league play, with both NASL clubs playing in the preliminary round, the winner of which advances to the semifinals.

All rounds of the competition are played via a two-leg home-and-away knock-out format. The higher seeded team had the option of deciding which leg it played at home. The team that scores the greater aggregate of goals in the two matches advances. Toronto FC, was declared champion and earns the right to play in the CONCACAF Champions League playoff match.

Each series was a two-game aggregate goal series with the away goals rule.

Matches

Preliminary round

First leg

Second leg

Ottawa won 3–2 on aggregate.

Semifinals

First leg

Second leg

Vancouver won 3–2 on aggregate.

Toronto won 4–2 on aggregate.

Final

First leg

Second leg

2–2 on aggregate. Toronto won on away goals.

Goalscorers

References 

2016
2016 in Canadian soccer
2016 domestic association football cups